Berschweiler bei Baumholder is an Ortsgemeinde – a municipality belonging to a Verbandsgemeinde, a kind of collective municipality – in the Birkenfeld district in Rhineland-Palatinate, Germany. It belongs to the Verbandsgemeinde of Baumholder, whose seat is in the like-named town. Berschweiler bei Baumholder is one of two municipalities in the district with the name Berschweiler. The two are distinguished from each other by their geographical “tags”; the other one is called Berschweiler bei Kirn.

Geography

Location
Berschweiler lies in the Westrich, an historic region that encompasses areas in both Germany and France. It is roughly 5 km southwest of Baumholder and 11 km southeast of Birkenfeld.

Neighbouring municipalities
Clockwise from the north, these are Fohren-Linden to the north, Mettweiler to the east, Eckersweiler to the south and Rohrbach to the west.

Constituent communities
Also belonging to Berschweiler are the outlying homesteads of Im Hahn, Hof Am Forst and Zollhaus.

Politics

Municipal council
The council is made up of 12 council members, who were elected by majority vote at the municipal election held on 7 June 2009, and the honorary mayor as chairman.

Mayor
Berschweiler’s mayor is Rouven Hebel.

Coat of arms
The municipality’s arms might be described thus: Per fess argent a demilion azure armed and langued gules, and azure on a wall issuant from base masoned sable a limetree eradicated, all of the first.

The blue lion is a reference to the village’s former allegiance to the County of Veldenz.

Culture and sightseeing

Buildings
The following are listed buildings or sites in Rhineland-Palatinate’s Directory of Cultural Monuments:
 Evangelical parish church, Hauptstraße 9 – aisleless church 1743, west tower 1863/1864; two bells, 14th century and 1499 by Master Jörg zu Spier
 Beside Am Kirchpfad 1 – cellar and storehouse, building with saddle roof with two parallel barrel vaults, possibly from as long ago as the 18th century
 Hauptstraße 34 – former rectory; many-winged Late Historicist solid building, 1901
 Hauptstraße 40 – former mayor’s residence; villalike historicized plastered building, 1905
 Hauptstraße 24, 30, 40, 44 (monumental zone) – Late Historicist villalike houses, early 20th century, bearing witness to the village centre’s former character

Clubs
Besides the gymnastic and sport club (which has a team partnership with FC Westrich Mettweiler, as SG Unnertal) and the volunteer fire brigade, there is also a shooting club that can already boast of some successes at the national level. Many other clubs offer the opportunity to get involved with other inhabitants.

Economy and infrastructure

Transport
Owing to its location on the Autobahn feeder road to the A 62 (Kaiserslautern–Trier), the village has at its disposal very good transport links. Kaiserslautern, Trier and Saarbrücken too can all be reached within one hour.

Education
Besides the primary school, Berschweiler also has a kindergarten. Both are found right at the sport facilities, making it possible for the classes to use the football pitch and the multipurpose hall.

Other public institutions
Likewise standing near the sport facilities is a village community centre, which also houses the local reserve fire brigade (which can be called to support other fire brigades in the area). Also, there are an Evangelical parish house and a savings bank branch.

Sport and leisure
The municipality has at its disposal two football pitches, a cinder lot on the Bornberg somewhat outside the village and a grass playing field in the outlying centre of Berggrube.

Also available is a multipurpose hall with a small-calibre shooting range.

Gastronomy
In the old village centre at the marketplace is found the Haus Albert, which offers both a restaurant and overnight accommodation.

References

External links
  
 Berschweiler in the collective municipality’s webpages 

Birkenfeld (district)